The Air Force Academy is a census-designated place (CDP) located in El Paso County, Colorado, United States. The CDP includes the developed portion of the United States Air Force Academy, including the cadet housing facilities. The CDP is a part of the Colorado Springs, CO Metropolitan Statistical Area. The USAF Academy post office (ZIP Codes 80840 and 80841 (for post office boxes) serves the area. At the United States Census 2020, the population of the Air Force Academy CDP was 6,680.

Geography

Demographics

See also

United States Air Force Academy
Outline of Colorado
Index of Colorado-related articles
State of Colorado
Colorado cities and towns
Colorado census designated places
Colorado counties
El Paso County, Colorado
List of statistical areas in Colorado
Front Range Urban Corridor
South Central Colorado Urban Area
Colorado Springs, CO Metropolitan Statistical Area
Rampart Range

References

External links

United States Air Force Academy website
United States Air Force Academy Visitor Center

Census-designated places in El Paso County, Colorado
Census-designated places in Colorado
United States Air Force Academy